Suddeth is a English surname .

Notables with this name include
Greg Suddeth, screenwriter of Pet Shop (film)
Lauren Alaina Kristine Suddeth, singer
Jill Suddeth, Olympic synchronised swimmer with Heather Simmons-Carrasco

References